Eupithecia parallelaria is a moth in the family Geometridae. It is found in Turkmenistan, Iran, eastern Afghanistan and Kashmir.

References

Moths described in 1893
parallelaria
Moths of Asia